Same-sex marriage is legal in Aguascalientes in accordance with a ruling from the Supreme Court of Justice of the Nation on 2 April 2019 that the state's ban on same-sex marriage violated Articles 1 and 4 of the Constitution of Mexico. The ruling came into effect upon publication in the Official Gazette of the Federation on 16 August 2019, legalizing same-sex marriage in Aguascalientes.

Legal history

Background

The Mexican Supreme Court ruled on 12 June 2015 that state bans on same-sex marriage are unconstitutional nationwide. The court's ruling is considered a "jurisprudential thesis" and did not invalidate state laws, meaning that same-sex couples denied the right to marry would still have to seek individual amparos in court. The ruling standardized the procedures for judges and courts throughout Mexico to approve all applications for same-sex marriages and made the approval mandatory.

In May 2014, couple Manuel Gutiérrez Flores and Javier Rodrígueza Rivero requested an amparo against the civil registry in Aguascalientes City after it had rejected their request for a marriage license. The couple contested the constitutionality of articles 143, 144 and 313bis of the Civil Code. Article 143 defined marriage as "the union of one man and one woman", and article 313bis similarly defined concubinage as between "one man and one woman". Article 144 characterized marriage as an institution whose purpose was "perpetuating the species". The amparo was approved by a court on 29 August 2014, and the couple married on 3 September 2014, making them the first same-sex couple to marry in Aguascalientes.

A lesbian couple, Susana Ortega Guzmán and Mariana Martín Aguirre, applied for an amparo in May 2014 and received a favorable verdict on 2 September 2014. They married on 21 August 2015. On 1 September 2014, Julián Elizalde Peña, coordinator of the organization Colectivo SerGay de Aguascalientes, announced that a third amparo had been requested. Elizalde Peña announced that two more amparos were pending on 13 October 2014. In December 2016, another same-sex couple was granted an amparo to marry, and another was granted by the Fourth District Court to a lesbian couple on 25 January 2017. In late November 2017, four more amparos for same-sex marriage rights were approved by the courts. By December 2017, 14 same-sex couples had married in the state. That number increased to 23 in 2018, all via the amparo remedy.

Legislative proposals

A civil union bill was first proposed in Aguascalientes in 2010 by Deputy Nora Ruvalcaba Gámez. The measure would have established a legal institution with several of the rights, benefits, obligations and responsibilities of marriage. Opposition from the Institutional Revolutionary Party (PRI) and the National Action Party (PAN) crippled its passage in Congress.

In September 2014, Deputy Cuauhtemoc Escobedo Tejad from the Party of the Democratic Revolution (PRD) announced that Governor Carlos Lozano de la Torre would introduce a civil union bill and possibly a same-sex marriage bill to the Congress of Aguascalientes. Escobeda Tejada further announced that if Lozano de la Torre did not introduce a bill, he would do so himself. On 4 November 2014, Escobedo Tejada presented a civil union proposal to Congress, defining the civil partnership as "living together, forming a heritage, having children if they wish, and dealing with situations that arise for a couple." A citizens' initiative for same-sex marriage had been introduced to Congress a few weeks prior to his bill. Debate on three initiatives with different schemes for marriage and civil unions began on 21 November 2014.

On 15 June 2016, Martha Márquez Alvarado, a congresswoman from the National Action Party, indicated that she was preparing another civil union proposal and would present it to Congress when ready. In April 2017, the State Human Rights Commission announced it would introduce a new same-sex marriage bill, and in October 2017 another marriage bill was introduced to Congress by PRD Deputy Josefina Moreno Pérez. In April 2018, the National Action Party, which holds a majority of seats in the Congress of Aguascalientes, announced it would oppose all the proposed same-sex marriage and civil union bills, and would not allow legislative hearings on any of them.

Action of unconstitutionality (2018–2019)
In 2018, the National Human Rights Commission filed an action of unconstitutionality (acción de inconstitucionalidad; docketed 40/2018) against articles 143, 144 and 313bis of the Civil Code. The Congress of Aguascalientes had recently amended state family law but while doing so did not repeal the state's ban on same-sex marriage. The Commission took this opportunity to file the action of unconstitutionality.

On 2 April 2019, the full bench of the Mexican Supreme Court ruled unanimously that the three articles in question were void and unconstitutional, determining that banning same-sex couples from marrying violates Articles 1 and 4 of the Constitution of Mexico. Article 1 of the Constitution states that "any form of discrimination, based on ethnic or national origin, gender, age, disabilities, social status, medical conditions, religion, opinions, sexual orientation, marital status, or any other form, which violates the human dignity or seeks to annul or diminish the rights and freedoms of the people, is prohibited.", and Article 4 relates to matrimonial equality, stating that "man and woman are equal under the law. The law shall protect the organization and development of the family." The court also ruled that section 1 of article 73 of the Law on the Security of Social Services for Public Servants was unconstitutional in limiting social security and health care benefits to opposite-sex married or cohabiting couples.

The ruling came into effect once Congress was officially notified and upon publication in the Official Gazette of the Federation (Diario Oficial de la Federación) on 16 August 2019. Prior to this date, the civil registry had already begun processing marriage applications from same-sex couples and issuing marriage licenses. A couple applied to marry the same day as the ruling was handed down, and wed shortly thereafter. On 6 April 2019, a same-sex couple, together for 11 years, wed in a Masonic ceremony in Aguascalientes City.

Marriage statistics
The following table shows the number of same-sex marriages performed in Aguascalientes since legalization in 2019 as reported by the National Institute of Statistics and Geography.

Public opinion
A 2017 opinion poll conducted by Gabinete de Comunicación Estratégica found that 50% of Aguascalientes residents supported same-sex marriage, while 45% were opposed.

According to a 2018 survey by the National Institute of Statistics and Geography, 36% of the Aguascalientes public opposed same-sex marriage.

See also
 Same-sex marriage in Mexico
 LGBT rights in Mexico

References

External links
Acción de Inconstitucionalidad 40/2018, Supreme Court ruling declaring Aguascalientes' same-sex marriage ban unconstitutional

Aguascalientes
Aguascalientes
2019 in LGBT history